William Parr may refer to:

 William Parr (died 1483) (1434–1483), English courtier and soldier
 William Parr, 1st Baron Parr of Horton (–1547), English courtier
 William Parr, 1st Marquess of Northampton (1513–1571), English courtier, brother of Catherine Parr
 William Parr (explorer), Australian explorer
 William Parr (footballer) (1915–1942), English footballer
 William Parr (1813 convict), British convict transported to New South Wales in 1813